Hawa Essuman (born 1980) is a film director based in Nairobi, Kenya. Her 2017 feature-length documentary Silas, co-directed with Anjali Neyar, tells the story of Liberian environmental activist Silas Siakor's fight to preserve the country's rainforests from commercial logging. The film won multiple awards, including the Amnesty International Durban Human Rights Award (2018) and the Audience Award for best documentary at the Riverrun Film Festival (2018). Hawa's first feature film, Soul Boy (2010), also received a series of awards. In addition, Hawa has produced a range of TV programmes, commercial films, music videos and adverts.

Biography
Born in Hamburg, Germany, on 23 January 1980, she is the daughter of Ghanaian parents who brought her up in Nairobi, Kenya. After several appearances in the theatre, she moved into production work, first on television commercials and documentaries, then on a local drama series, Makutano Junction. She created and directed Selfish? in 2008, followed by three short films in 2008, The Lift, Cold War and Coming Out.

With the encouragement and assistance of Tom Tykwer, she directed Soul Boy (2010). Based on a story by Billy Kahora, it originated at a workshop organized by the German association One Fine Day. Presented at over 40 film festivals around the world, it won a number of awards.

Awards 
Essuman's 'Silas' has won the following awards:
Documentary audience award 2018 - Riverrun Film Festival 
Best Documentary and Best International Film 2018 - Zanzibar International Film Festival
Documentary Audience Award 2018 - Afrika film festival Köln, Germany
Amnesty International Durban Human Rights Award 2018 - Durban International Film Festival 
Green Warsaw Award 2018 - Warsaw Film Festival 
William W. Warner Beautiful Swimmers Award 2018 - Environmental Film Festival in the Nation's Capital: Washington - 
Best documentary feature 2018 Footcandle Film Festival

Essuman's Soul Boy has won the following awards:
Dioraphte Audience Award, International Film Festival Rotterdam
Veto Award, Afrika-Filmfestival, Leuven, Belgium
Signis Award, Zanzibar International Film Festival, Zanzibar, Tanzania
Polish Filmmakers Association Award, Ale Kino!, Poznań, Poland
Best Short Film, Kalasha Awards, Nairobi, Kenya
Best Lead Actor: Samson Odhiambo, Kalasha Awards, Nairobi, Kenya
Best Scriptwriter: Billy Kahora, Kalasha Awards, Nairobi, Kenya
Best Actor: Samson Odhiambo, Kenya International Film Festival, Nairobi, Kenya
Best East African Film, Kenya International Film Festival, Nairobi, Kenya
Special Mention "Passeurs d’images" prize, FESTIVAL CINÉ JUNIOR (International Film Festival for Young people), Paris, France
The Young Jury Prize, FESTIVAL CINÉ JUNIOR (International Film Festival for Young people), Paris, France
Spiritual Film Festival Award, Paris
Best Children's Film Award at the Film Festival Recklinghausen (Germany) 2011
Best Editor: Ephantus Ng'ethe Gitungo, African Movie Academy Awards

References

External links
Hawa Essuman's website

1980 births
German emigrants to Kenya
People from Nairobi
Kenyan stage actresses
Kenyan film directors
Kenyan women film directors
Living people